Pulse of Europe is a pro-European citizen's initiative, founded in Frankfurt, Germany by the end of 2016. It aims at "encouraging citizens of the European Union  to speak out publicly in favour of a pan-European identity". As Europe is facing democratic deficits, the imminent Brexit as well as the growing popularity of right-wing populist and nationalist political parties, the initiative aims at counteracting euroscepticism. Pulse of Europe is organised in city groups, and has been active in over 130 cities in 20 European countries. Pulse of Europe is registered as an association (e. V.) headquartered in Frankfurt, but city groups are largely self-organised.

Basic principles and goals 
Pulse of Europe refers to ten basic principles which guide their actions:
 Europe must not fail: the initiative perceives the very idea of the European Union to be at stake in case of eurosceptic parties prevailing  in the upcoming national elections in the Netherlands, France and Germany in 2017. It appeals to pro-European citizens to promote and support the European idea in public, and vote accordingly.
 The threat to peace: the European Union is seen as the main warrantor of peace in Europe. Therefore, the union must not fail.
 We are responsible: all parts of the society are regarded as responsible to counteract any attempts at dividing the union.
 Get up and vote: adopting the idea of the existence of a "silent majority" of pro-European citizens, the initiative calls for voting for pro-European parties.
 Basic rights and Rule of law are inviolable: on the background of recent attempts to restrict by law the freedom of the press in single member states of the Union "individual freedom, justice and the Rule of law must be maintained in all of Europe."
 European fundamental freedoms are not negotiable: the European basic freedoms are seen as historical achievements, transforming single national states into one community. A balance of legal rights and duties must be maintained in all countries of Europe.
 Reforms are necessary: the European idea must be reformed in order to secure and strengthen the ongoing support of the Union by the people of Europe.
 Take mistrust seriously: any concerns regarding the Union are to be taken seriously, and solutions have to be found, in order to restore the trust towards the future of Europe.
 Diversity and joint qualities: maintaining the European identity includes the preservation of its regional and national diversity, which is understood as an enrichment.
 We all can, and should be a part of it: Pulse of Europe regards itself as an initiative which remains independent from any religious or political conviction, dedicated to the preservation of the European civil society.

Foundation and development 
The citizen's initiative was founded by the German lawyers Daniel and Sabine Röder. Using their private network of friends and social media, they held a first public meeting in Frankfurt, Germany, by the end of November 2016. Initially attracting about 200 attendants, further demonstrations followed at weekly intervals from January 2017 onwards. The initiative spread from Frankfurt to other German towns and other European cities outside Germany. In preparation of the elections in the Netherlands on 12 March 2017, the demonstrations adopted the campaign and its accompanying slogan "Blijf bij ons" of the pro-European initiative WhyEurope.

On 5 March 2017, public meetings were held in 35 European cities. 28 of these were German, but citizens also met in Amsterdam, the French cities of Paris, Strasbourg, Montpellier, Toulouse, and Lyon, and in the English city of Bath. On 12 March 2017, more than 20,000 people joined demonstrations in more than 40 European cities. Until May 2018 the number of participating cities rose to 118 in 18 European countries, but public attention and attendance declined after the elections in the Netherlands, France, and Germany had taken place. In 2019, Pulse of Europe associated with the German School strike for climate initiative.

References

External links 

Politics of the European Union
Pro-Europeanism